Purism, SPC is an American computer technology corporation based in San Francisco, California and registered in the state of Washington.

Purism manufactures the Librem personal computing devices with a focus on software freedom, computer security, and Internet privacy. In addition to hardware, Purism also maintains PureOS, an operating system along with Librem One, a suite of software as a service based on open standards.

History 
Purism was founded in 2014 with the start of a crowdfunding campaign for the Librem 15, an attempt to manufacture an Intel-based high-end laptop for Linux with "almost no proprietary software". A second campaign funded development of a 13-inch model with hardware switches to disable the microphone and camera as a privacy feature. Kill switches were also added to the 15-inch model.

The two campaigns raised  from 1,042 initial backers, and production began at the end of 2015. In 2017 Purism announced its transition from a build to order to a build to stock order fulfillment model.

Purism reincorporated as a social purpose corporation in February 2017 and announced the change in May.

Products

PureOS 
Purism manages development of PureOS, a free Linux distribution based on Debian. PureOS mostly ships with software from the Debian software repository but has all software removed that violates Purism's guidelines and the GNU Free System Distribution Guidelines. PureOS was endorsed by the Free Software Foundation in December 2017. Librem laptops ship with PureOS by default and an optional Qubes OS Universal Serial Bus (USB) drive. Purism says that it is easy for Librem device owners to install alternative Linux distributions and that owners have the freedom to install any operating system that they desire.

Librem hardware 

Librem has been the brand name used by Purism for all of their computer hardware products since the firm's first website in late 2014. The name is based on the French word libre for the English word free as used in the term logiciel libre for free software.

Purism devices feature hardware kill switches to allow users to shut off the camera, Wi-Fi, Bluetooth, and cellular or mobile broadband modem on devices that have one (or can be purchased air gapped).

Laptops 
Purism's first products were two laptop computers. Since late 2015, they have made laptops of two sizes: Librem 13 and 15, featuring a 13 and a 15-inch screen, respectively. These products ship with Purism's own operating system, PureOS, a derivative of Debian GNU/Linux, and an optional Qubes OS USB drive.

Purism does its best to remove Intel's Management Engine from its Librem laptops, considering it a security problem. Still, it was not able to completely avoid use of proprietary BIOS firmware, earning it criticism from the Coreboot and Libreboot projects (which are working on completely free firmware, but as of 2015 had not yet achieved support of the contemporary hardware that Librem was using). Since summer 2017, new Librem laptops are shipped with coreboot as their standard BIOS, and updates are available for all older models.

In July 2020, Purism announced the Librem 14, the successor of the Librem 13. The Librem 14 features a 10th generation Intel processor, and was scheduled to begin shipping in February 2021.

Comparison of laptops

Tablet: Librem 11 
Purism has proposed a 2-in-1 PC, a convertible, hybrid, tablet-to-laptop computer: the Librem 11, sometimes termed Librem 10 or 12. It would have an 11-inch touchscreen in an 11.6-inch body with a detachable keyboard, and an optional docking station. Development on the device began in April 2016 and was suspended in October 2018 to focus on the Librem 5 smartphone.

Smartphone: Librem 5 

The Librem 5 is Purism's first smartphone. They began a funding campaign on 24 August 2017, for a $599 "security and privacy focused phone". The 60-day funding campaign aimed to collect , however the goal was surpassed two weeks early and concluded with US$2,677,609.10 raised, 78% over the goal. The phone's operating system is entirely free software: it comes with PureOS pre-installed but also supports Ubuntu Touch. Further, the baseband processor is separated from the CPU main bus and instead connected via a fast USB interface, thus isolated from the main CPU RAM bus. Also, the phone features hardware kill switches for the isolated baseband processor, Wi-Fi, Bluetooth, camera, and microphone. The firmware for the cellular modem on the phone is proprietary. On September 24, 2019, Purism announced that the first batch of Librem 5 phones had started shipping. On December 6, 2019, Purism announced Librem 5 USA–the same phone, with Made in USA electronic fabrication.

Librem Key 
The Librem Key is a hardware USB security token with many features, including integration with tamper-evident Heads Firmware. Heads helps to ensure that the Librem laptop's BIOS was not altered since the last laptop boot. The Librem Key also holds a one-time password storage (3x HOTP (RFC 4226), 15 x TOTP (RFC 6238)), integrated password manager (16 entries), 40 kbit/s true random number generator, and tamper-resistant smart card.

Librem One 
Librem One is a paid subscription, free-software social-networking suite launched April 30, 2019 to bring decentralized, privacy-respecting applications to a wider user base. The first components released were Librem Mail supporting OpenPGP standards using a K-9-based client; Librem Tunnel based on OpenVPN; Librem Social microblogging using Mastodon server and Tusky-based client software federated via the ActivityPub protocol, and Librem Chat using Element software federated via Matrix and XMPP.

See also 

 Linux adoption
 System76
 Framework Computer
 Pine64

References

External links 
 
 Purism on Odysee.com
 Purism on Mastodon.social

2014 establishments in California
American brands
Computer companies established in 2014
Computer companies of the United States
Computer hardware companies
Consumer electronics brands
Electronics companies established in 2014
Free culture movement
Home computer hardware companies
Linux
Manufacturing companies based in the San Francisco Bay Area
Mobile phone manufacturers
Netbook manufacturers
Online retailers of the United States
Open-source hardware
Technology companies based in the San Francisco Bay Area